The 1926 German football championship, the 19th edition of the competition, was won by SpVgg Fürth, defeating Hertha BSC 4–1 in the final.

For SpVgg Fürth it was the second national championship after winning the 1914 edition and it won a third and last one in 1929, also against Hertha BSC. For Hertha it marked the club's first final appearance and it played in six consecutive ones, losing the first four and winning the final two in 1930 and 1931.

Hamburger SV's Tull Harder was the top scorer of the 1926 championship with six goals, having previously done so in 1922 and 1923 and, again, in 1928.

Sixteen club qualified for the knock-out competition, two from each of the regional federations plus an additional third club from the South and West. In all cases the regional champions and runners-up qualified. In the West and South the third spot went to the third placed team of the championship.

The eventual champions, SpVgg Fürth, failed to qualify for the Southern German championship through the Bezirksliga Bayern, coming only third behind league champions FC Bayern Munich runners-up 1. FC Nürnberg, when only the champions advanced. Instead, Fürth won the Southern German Cup and qualified through this route for the Southern German finals where it than finished runners-up.

Qualified teams
The teams qualified through the regional championships:

Competition

Round of 16
The round of 16, played on 16 May 1926:

|}

Quarter-finals
The quarter-finals, played on 30 May 1926:

|}

Semi-finals
The semi-finals, played on 6 June 1926:

|}

Final

References

Sources
 kicker Allmanach 1990, by kicker, page 160 to 178 – German championship
 Süddeutschlands Fussballgeschichte in Tabellenform 1897-1988  History of Southern German football in tables, publisher & author: Ludolf Hyll

External links
 German Championship 1925–26 at weltfussball.de 
 German Championship 1926 at RSSSF

1
German
German football championship seasons